Shahdol Division is an administrative division of the Indian state of Madhya Pradesh.

The division was inaugurated on 14 June 2008. It comprises Shahdol, Umaria, Anuppur. Initially Dindori was also the part of this division. But, now it is in Jabalpur Division. At present, there are only three districts in Shahdol division i.e., Shahdol, Umaria and Anuppur. While Anuppur, Shahdol and Umaria districts used to be part of Rewa Division, Dindori district was part of Jabalpur Division.

References

Divisions of Madhya Pradesh